The Forbidden City is the second book in the World of Lone Wolf book series created by Joe Dever and written by Ian Page.  It is one of four books in the mini-series and features Grey Star, for whom the first book is named, a young Wizard trained by the enigmatic Shianti to stop the Wytch-King and his Shadakine Empire. All four of the Grey Star books were released by Project Aon along with many of the other installments of the Lone Wolf series.

Gameplay
The gameplay of the World of Lone Wolf series is very much like the other Lone Wolf books, but features a few key differences. One is the inclusion of Willpower, which can be used for various Magical effects in the game, and maybe most importantly to loose a blast of Magic from your Wizards Staff when it is in your possession. The ability to vanquish some enemies with the expenditure of a Willpower point or two introduces a key strategic consideration in which the reader must choose between the likely loss of Endurance that comes with fighting enemies, and the amount of Willpower that should be saved for later in the story.

Plot
The series plays for the most part at the tip of south-eastern Magnamund, in the land then known as the Shadakine Empire. A tyrant called Shasarak the Wytch-King has subjugated the people and with the help of seven Shadaki Wytches is ruling with an iron fist. The Second installment of the World of Lone Wolf series takes place after Grey Star has found the Lost Tribe of Azanam. Grey Star begins his journey with the aid of a Kundi mystic named Urik, and journeys through Desolation Valley, beyond the Mountains of Morn. There, he makes new allies, faces new dangers, and helps to stoke the flames of a fledgling rebellion against the Shadakine Empire, all in a desperate attempt to find the Shadow Gate and travel through it to the Daziarn plane and retrieve the Moonstone of the Shianti.

External links
Project Aon - The Forbidden City
Gamebooks - The Forbidden City

Lone Wolf (gamebooks)
1986 fiction books
Berkley Books books